Francky-Edgard Mbotto (born 2 September 1997 in Bangui) is a Central African middle-distance runner. He competed in the men's 800 metres at the 2016 Summer Olympics and the 2020 Summer Olympics.

Career
In 2015, Mbotto left football to start athletics thanks to his sport teacher. He met Vincent Ledauphin, his current coach. This meeting had a huge impact on his life. Thanks to his coach, Francky started to train seriously. He ran 400m and quickly became successful at the regional level. In 2016, one year after its athletics debut — the Rio Olympic year - he switched to the 800m then ran 1.50 seconds while he was a junior. 
This time enabled him to be contacted by the Central African Republic athletics federation, to be a part of the delegation of its native country. He made its first national selection during the Olympic games of Rio at the age of 18 years old. 
Heat 7, lane 4, he finished last in 1.52.89. 

In 2017, He competed in the IAAF world championship in London. He came sixth in heat-5, against huge performers like Pierre Ambroise Bosse (world champion this year - 2017), Nijel Amos (second fastest 800m runner ever) and Adam Kzcot (Vice world champion this year - 2017)

In 2018, he won the U23 French national outdoor title but he finished second in the indoor U23 national championship. 

In 2019, he was selected as part of the national delegation to run 800m during the 2019 African Games. Unfortunately, he was injured after 400m and was unable to finish the race. This injury caused him to miss the 2019 World Athletics Championships in Doha, Qatar.

References

1997 births
Living people
Central African Republic male middle-distance runners
Olympic athletes of the Central African Republic
Athletes (track and field) at the 2016 Summer Olympics
Athletes (track and field) at the 2020 Summer Olympics
Place of birth missing (living people)
World Athletics Championships athletes for the Central African Republic
Athletes (track and field) at the 2019 African Games
African Games competitors for the Central African Republic